KZPH may refer to:

 KKWN, a radio station (106.7 FM) licensed to serve Cashmere, Washington, United States, which held the call sign KZPH from February 1991 to January 2008
 The ICAO code for Zephyrhills Municipal Airport in Zephyrhills, Florida, United States